Alder is a census-designated place (CDP) in Pierce County, Washington, United States. The population was 227 at the 2010 census.  The community is located along the shore of Alder Lake on State Route Highway 7 near the entrance to Mount Rainier National Park.

A post office called Alder was established in 1902, and remained in operation until 1975. The community was named for the alder trees near the original town site.

Geography
Alder is located at  (46.787849, -122.26619).

According to the United States Census Bureau, the CDP has a total area of 3.24 square miles (8.4 km), of which, 3.21 square miles (8.3 km) of it is land and 0.03 square miles (0.08 km) of it (0.83%) is water.

References

Census-designated places in Pierce County, Washington
Census-designated places in Washington (state)